Bi Yan (born 17 February 1984) is a Chinese footballer who played as a midfielder and competed at the 2004 Summer Olympics.

In 2004, she finished ninth with the Chinese team in the women's tournament. She played both matches.

International goals

References

External links
 Profile at Eurosport

1984 births
Living people
Chinese women's footballers
Women's association football midfielders
China women's international footballers
Footballers at the 2004 Summer Olympics
Footballers at the 2008 Summer Olympics
Olympic footballers of China
2003 FIFA Women's World Cup players
2007 FIFA Women's World Cup players
Footballers from Dalian
Asian Games medalists in football
Footballers at the 2002 Asian Games
Footballers at the 2006 Asian Games
Asian Games silver medalists for China
Asian Games bronze medalists for China
Medalists at the 2002 Asian Games
Medalists at the 2006 Asian Games
Universiade gold medalists for China
Universiade medalists in football
FIFA Century Club
Medalists at the 2011 Summer Universiade